Jamie John Langley (born 21 December 1983) is an assistant coach at Sale Sharks in Premiership Rugby and an English former professional rugby league footballer.

A Great Britain representative , he has also played for England and with Bradford Bulls won the Super League championship and Challenge Cup with them, and he has also played for the Hull Kingston Rovers and the Sheffield Eagles. Jamie Langley is the son of the rugby league footballer who played in the 1960s and 1970s for Leeds; John Langley.

He played for the  Super League side the Bradford Bulls in England. He was named the vice-captain for the 2010 season, which was also his testimonial season.

Background
Langley was born in Normanton, West Yorkshire.

Bradford Bulls
Having won Super League VIII, Bradford played against 2003 NRL Premiers, the Penrith Panthers in the 2004 World Club Challenge. Langley played from the interchange bench in the Bulls' 22-4 victory. Langley played for the Bradford Bulls from the interchange bench in their 2004 Super League Grand Final loss against the Leeds Rhinos. In 2005 he made 28 appearances and played for the Bradford Bulls from the interchange bench in their 2005 Super League Grand Final victory against the Leeds Rhinos. As Super League champions Bradford faced National Rugby League premiers Wests Tigers in the 2006 World Club Challenge. Langley played at loose forward in the Bulls' 30-10 victory.

Awards
In 2006 Jamie was awarded 3 club awards for his performances throughout the season, these included; The Peter Lovett Trophy for Top Tackler and the Telegraph and Argus Best Average Award, with 7.39. He also got Head Coach Steve McNamara’s vote as Prized Bull.

Langley signed a new 3-year contract on 3 April 2007 to keep at the Bulls until 2010. Langley missed the later part of 2007 through injury.

Representative
Jamie Langley won caps for England while at Bradford Bulls in 2004 against Russia, France, and Ireland, and won a cap for Great Britain while at Bradford Bulls in 2007 against Fiji (sub).

England Academy
Langley also captained the England Academy team that famously defeated the Australian schoolboys side.

Great Britain
In June 2007 Langley was called up to the Great Britain squad for the Test match against France He was also called up for the Great Britain Train on Squad for the test series with New Zealand.

England
In September 2008 he was named in the England training squad for the 2008 Rugby League World Cup, and in October 2008 he was named in the final 24-man England squad.

He was named in the England team to face Wales at the Keepmoat Stadium prior to England's departure for the 2008 Rugby League World Cup.

Coaching career

London Broncos
On 13 October 2015, Langley announced he had retired from playing rugby league and was appointed head coach of the academy at the London Broncos (who compete in the u19s and u16s Super League Academy leagues) on a 2-year contract.

Sale Sharks 
Langley joined Sale Sharks as Peak Performance Coach in May 2021, joining former team mates Paul Deacon and Mike Forshaw at the club..

Statistics

Club career

Representative career

Outside rugby league
In 2013, Langley launched a clothing brand with former team mates Wayne Godwin and Duane Straugheir named 'We Are Taurus'.

References

External links
London Broncos profile
(archived by web.archive.org) Bradford Bulls profile
(archived by web.archive.org) Jamie Langley's Official Site
(archived by web.archive.org) Langers signs on for 3 more
(archived by web.archive.org) Lynch and Langley clean up Bulls awards

1983 births
Living people
Bradford Bulls players
England national rugby league team players
English rugby league players
Great Britain national rugby league team players
Hull Kingston Rovers players
Rugby league locks
Rugby league players from Wakefield
Rugby league second-rows
Sheffield Eagles players
Sportspeople from Normanton, West Yorkshire